"The One with Ross's New Girlfriend" is the first episode of Friends second season. It first aired on the NBC network in the United States on September 21, 1995.

Plot
Continuing where the first season finale left off, Rachel goes to the airport to greet Ross as he returns from China and tell him she would like to give their relationship a chance. However, she sees Ross arrive with his new girlfriend, paleontologist and former graduate school classmate Julie. Chandler, feeling guilty for both telling Ross to move on from Rachel and letting slip to her Ross's feelings for her, talks with Ross to get an explanation of how everything happened and how it is going with Julie. Chandler's talk with Ross fails to console Rachel, as Ross confirms that he is having a great time with Julie. Everyone soon tires of Ross and Julie's displays of affection – including Rachel, who has a one-night stand with old flame Paolo in order to try and get over it.

Rachel finally tells Ross that she and Paolo are not getting back together and that it was a mistake, and is about to confess her feelings for him. But after Ross gets his feelings for Paolo, specifically that he is "scum", off his chest, he tells Rachel he thinks she should be with someone who considers himself lucky to have her – like he is with Julie. When she hears this, Rachel has nothing more to say to him, realizing that Ross is truly happy with Julie.

Chandler needs a pair of pants altered, so Joey sends him to the Tribbiani family tailor. All is fine – until the tailor measures Chandler's inseam a little too well. Chandler comes back angry and blames Joey for the fiasco. Joey still thinks that is how tailors do inseams, until Ross and Chandler convince him about the real intentions of the tailor. Joey realises and is found calling all his relatives about the problem.

Meanwhile, Monica wants Phoebe to give her a new haircut, since she did such a great job with Joey's and Chandler's haircuts. Phoebe, aware of Monica's pickiness, declines at first but eventually relents. Monica requests that Phoebe cut her hair like Demi Moore; Phoebe gets confused and cuts her hair like Dudley Moore. Monica is very upset and the rest of the gang try hard to console her. In the tag scene, Julie asks Phoebe to cut her hair for her like Andie MacDowell. When she asks Rachel for advice on how to cut it, Rachel gets her revenge on Julie by describing Andie MacDowell as "the guy from Planet Of The Apes".

In a deleted scene, Phoebe pokes fun at Rachel when she demands to know who gave Julie the number to her and Monica's apartment.

Reception
In the original broadcast, the episode was viewed by 32.1 million viewers.

Sam Ashurst from Digital Spy ranked it #215 on their ranking of the 236 Friends episodes, and called the episode fine, but not especially funny. Telegraph & Argus also ranked it #215 on their ranking of all Friends episodes.

References

1995 American television episodes
Friends (season 2) episodes